ISO/IEC 18000, an international standard that describes a series of diverse RFID technologies, each using a unique frequency range
 OHSAS 18001, an internationally used British Standard for occupational health and safety management systems, sometimes erroneously cited as an ISO standard

18000
ISO/IEC standards
British Standards